Antiblemma calida is a moth of the family Noctuidae first described by Arthur Gardiner Butler in 1878. It is endemic to Jamaica.

References

Barnes, Matthew J. C. (May 24, 2002). "Antiblemma calida". Moths of Jamaica. Retrieved January 25, 2020.

Catocalinae
Moths of the Caribbean